Kristen Marie Pfaff (née Parco; May 26, 1967 – June 16, 1994) was an American musician, best known as the bassist for alternative rock band Hole from 1993 to 1994. Prior to Hole, Pfaff was the bassist and backing vocalist for Minneapolis-based band Janitor Joe. Pfaff returned to Janitor Joe for a short tour in the weeks before her death in June 1994 of a heroin overdose.

Early life and career
Pfaff was born to Janet Pfaff and her first husband, Mike Parco, in Buffalo, New York. Her birth father comes from a family of several highly successful musicians. Her parents divorced when she was a child, and her mother remarried to Norman Pfaff, who adopted Kristen and gave her his surname. She had two younger brothers, including Jason, a musician.  She studied classical piano and cello.

After graduating from Catholic school Buffalo Academy of the Sacred Heart in 1985, Pfaff spent a short time in Europe and briefly attended Boston College before ultimately finishing at the University of Minnesota, majoring in Women's Studies. There, she also worked as a counselor for rape victims. She was a part of Restore of the Sexual Violence Program, which offered a crisis line, counseling services and training in self-defense programs. Pfaff also took part in the annual 24 Hour Rape Free Zone in 1990, and was quoted as saying the goal was "to draw attention to violence brought against women on campus and in the world". During this time, she participated in the college radio station, Radio K, and she can be heard doing this in a short clip available on Soundcloud.

While living in Minneapolis, Minnesota following her graduation, Pfaff taught herself to play bass guitar. Pfaff, guitarist/vocalist Joachim Breuer (formerly of Minneapolis band "The Bastards") and drummer Matt Entsminger formed the band Janitor Joe in 1991.

Janitor Joe
The band's first single, "Hmong", was released in 1992.
Later that year, they released the "Bullethead" single on picture disc, which was followed in 1993 with the "Boyfriend" 7-inch and Janitor Joe's debut album Big Metal Birds. One Janitor Joe track, "Under The Knife", can also be found on an OXO records 4-track EP, released in 1993.

Janitor Joe were becoming a staple of the Minneapolis sound, influenced by the Pacific Northwest's early grunge sound and by the sharper, faster DC post-hardcore scene, as well as the stop-start distortion of the Butthole Surfers, Big Black and others on the Touch and Go label. Pfaff's playing style was central to Janitor Joe's relentless assault both live and on record, and she and Breuer both contributed songs to Big Metal Birds: "Both operate within easy reach of the line separating punishment and reward - Pfaff's contributions (the surly "Boys in Blue") tend to be slightly more spacious, while Breuer's ("One Eye," for instance) stipulate that drummer Matt Entsminger maintain perpetual motion", wrote David Sprague of Trouser Press.

The growing Minneapolis scene was beginning to attract music press attention in 1993. Amphetamine Reptile released a tour single, "Stinker", and Janitor Joe began to tour nationally. It was on one such tour in California that year that Pfaff was scouted by Eric Erlandson and Courtney Love of Hole, who were at the time looking for a new bassist. Love invited Pfaff to play with Hole; Pfaff declined and returned to Minneapolis, but Erlandson and Love continued to pursue her.

Hole
Pfaff, initially reluctant to leave Minneapolis and join Hole, reconsidered after advice from her father, Norman: "From a professional point of view, there was no decision", he later told Seattle Weekly, "because they are already on Geffen Records and already have this huge following in England... if you're wanting to move up the ladder, that's the way to go", although Kristen's mother Janet was more reluctant for her daughter to leave Minneapolis and Janitor Joe in favor of Seattle and Hole. Following international critical acclaim for their first, independent album, Pretty on the Inside, Hole had generated a great deal of major-label interest, eventually signing an eight-album deal with Geffen Records for a reported $3 million.

In 1993, Pfaff moved to Seattle, Washington, to work with the other members of Hole on Live Through This, the major-label follow-up to Pretty on the Inside. The band's new line-up – Love, Erlandson, Pfaff and Patty Schemel on drums – entered the studio in early 1993 to begin rehearsals. "That's when we took off," Eric Erlandson said of Pfaff joining. "All of a sudden, we became a real band."

Later years 
Pfaff's time in Seattle was a creatively rich period, and she formed close friendships with Eric Erlandson and Kurt Cobain. While working on the platinum selling album Live Through This, Pfaff and Erlandson dated, and stayed together for most of 1993, remaining close even after splitting up. All was not well, however; while living in Washington's 'heroin capital', Pfaff developed a problem with drug use. "Everybody was doing it. Everyone, everyone. All our friends were junkies. It was ridiculous. Everybody in this town did dope", said Love of this period in the Seattle music scene. By most accounts, Pfaff's own drug use was relatively moderate: "Kristen...dabbled in drugs before she was in our band, in Minneapolis, but it was very light", Erlandson told Craig Marks of Spin. "She moved to Seattle and felt disconnected from everything, and she made friends, drug connections, which I told her not to do. The only way you can survive in this town is if you don't make those connections." After the critical acclaim of Hole's Live Through This album, Pfaff decided to move back to Minnesota, partly because of her drug problem and partly because of creative differences within Hole.
 
Pfaff entered a Minneapolis detox center for heroin addiction in February 1994
and left Hole later that spring, to tour with Janitor Joe. "She went on tour... and when she came back from that, she was clean", says Erlandson.  In the wake of Cobain's death in April 1994, Pfaff decided to leave Hole, and return to Minneapolis permanently. After her tour with Janitor Joe, however, Pfaff made plans to return to Seattle in order to retrieve the rest of her belongings, making the trip to Seattle on June 14, 1994.

Death
On June 16, 1994, at around 9:30 a.m., Pfaff was found dead in her Seattle apartment by Paul Erickson, a friend with whom she had planned to leave for Minneapolis that day. She was 27 years old. On the floor was a bag containing syringes and drug paraphernalia. Pfaff's death was attributed to "acute opiate intoxication". She died two months after Cobain, who was a close friend as well as the husband of Hole's frontwoman Courtney Love.

Her father, Norman Pfaff, described her as "bright, personable, wonderful...very, very talented, smart, and she always seemed to be in control of her circumstances. Last night she wasn't." In the book Love & Death, released April 2004, Kristen Pfaff's mother, Janet Pfaff, states she has never accepted the official story regarding her daughter's death. Janet was interviewed by authors Wallace and Halperin in August 2003.

Eric Erlandson, the last person to see Pfaff alive before she overdosed on heroin, would later comment: "I admit, I made some stupid mistakes with some people, and people are dead because of my stupid mistakes. That's what I want to say. And I want to use that so that other people don't make the same mistakes that I made, and other people start understanding. I get emotional about this. We've all lost people."

Posthumous acknowledgements
After a period of mourning, Hole recruited bassist Melissa Auf der Maur and dedicated their first show of an extensive touring period to Pfaff. Hole's 1997 retrospective compilation My Body, the Hand Grenade is also dedicated to her.

On October 20, 1994, Janet Pfaff, Kristen's mother, accepted induction on her daughter's behalf into the Buffalo Music Hall of Fame. "I'm proud to accept this award for Kristen and I know she would be happy to receive it," Mrs. Pfaff said. "It's sad because Kristen wasn't here herself to enjoy the moment. You work so hard in the business to make it at the national level, and that's what Kristen did. I just wish she was here to enjoy it, and see how her hometown feels about her."
 	
A local Minneapolis radio station, University of Minnesota's KUOM, has started a yearly $1,000 Memorial Scholarship in her name. The award is earmarked for "individuals active in the arts in the pursuit of their educational goals." Portions from the proceeds of Hole's album sales have gone to the Kristen Pfaff Memorial Fund.

A book focusing on Pfaff's life and her work as an activist, counsellor and musician is forthcoming from English author Guy Mankowski. ‘I Know How To Live: The Story Of Kristen Pfaff’ draws from Kristen's archive, and will have a foreword by Kristen Pfaff’s brother Jason.

In October 2022 Mankowski's TED (conference) talk, entitled 'Lived Through This: Kristen Pfaff's hidden archive and influence' was published online.

Discography
Big Metal Birds (1993); with Janitor Joe
Live Through This (1994); with Hole
My Body, the Hand Grenade (1997); compilation by Hole, bass and backing vocals on "Old Age"

References

1967 births
1994 deaths
20th-century American musicians
Accidental deaths in Washington (state)
Alternative rock bass guitarists
American alternative rock musicians
American women rock singers
American rock bass guitarists
Burials at Forest Lawn Cemetery (Buffalo)
Deaths by heroin overdose in Washington (state)
Drug-related deaths in Washington (state)
Women bass guitarists
Grunge musicians
Hole (band) members
Musicians from Minneapolis
Singers from New York (state)
Musicians from Buffalo, New York
University of Minnesota College of Liberal Arts alumni
20th-century American singers
Guitarists from Minnesota
Guitarists from New York (state)
20th-century American women singers
20th-century American bass guitarists
Feminist musicians
20th-century American women guitarists